Unni Lehn (born 7 June 1977) is a retired Norwegian football midfielder. She has 133 appearances for Norway's national team.  In 2000 Lehn played 86 minutes of the Olympic Final in Sydney, in which Norway beat the US in extra time to take the gold medal.  She lives in Trondheim and played for Trondheims-Ørn from 1994 onwards, with over 400 appearances for the club during which they won the Norwegian league title and the Norwegian Cup competition several times.  From 2001 to 2003 she played in the US with Carolina Courage.  She announced her retirement from football at the end of 2007.

Unni Lehn has an economics degree and is continuing working at the BN Bank in Trondheim.

References

External links
Profile at club site

1977 births
Living people
People from Melhus
Norwegian women's footballers
Norway women's youth international footballers
Norway women's international footballers
SK Trondheims-Ørn players
Carolina Courage players
Norwegian expatriate women's footballers
Expatriate women's soccer players in the United States
Norwegian expatriate sportspeople in the United States
Footballers at the 2000 Summer Olympics
Olympic footballers of Norway
Olympic gold medalists for Norway
FIFA Century Club
Olympic medalists in football
Medalists at the 2000 Summer Olympics
Women's association football midfielders
2003 FIFA Women's World Cup players
1999 FIFA Women's World Cup players
Sportspeople from Trøndelag
Women's United Soccer Association players